Dividers is an outdoor sculpture located at Clarendon Dock, on the River Lagan, Belfast, Northern Ireland. It was produced in 2002 by artist Vivien Burnside and is an 8.3m tall set of dividers made of bronze with a stainless steel core. It was funded by Laganside Corporation, Belfast Harbour Commissioners and the National Lottery through the Arts Council of Northern Ireland.

References

Outdoor sculptures in Northern Ireland
2002 sculptures
Bronze sculptures in the United Kingdom